Galagedara is a village in the Western Province of Sri Lanka.

References

Populated places in Western Province, Sri Lanka